Mother-of-pearl carving is a traditional handicraft in Bethlehem, and is said to have been brought to the city by Franciscan friars from Italy in the 15th century.

History
Bethlehem's position as an important Christian city has for centuries attracted a constant stream of pilgrims. This generated much local work and income, also for women, including making mother-of-pearl souvenirs. According to Weir, Bethlehem women's employment in the mother-of-pearl industry goes back at least to the seventeenth century. It was noted by Richard Pococke,  who travelled there in 1727.

The first exhibition in the west of mother-of-pearl artifacts from Palestine was at The World Fair in New York in 1852. Two brothers, Giries and Ibrahim Mansur, exhibited their work and were a great success.

Previously, most of the oysters for the mother-of-pearl supply came from the Red Sea. As of 2007 however, Australia, California, New Zealand and Brazil are the main exporters of the mother-of-pearl.

Present day products include crosses, earrings, brooches and picture frames.

See also
Nacre
Palestinian handicrafts
Raden

References

Bibliography
Weir, Shelagh (1989). Palestinian Costume, London: British Museum Publications Ltd. . (exhibition catalog)
Pococke, R. (1811):  A General Collection of the Best and Most Interesting Voyages and Travels in All Parts of the World: Many of which are Now First Translated Into English,   (Popocke starts at p.  406)

External links
Mother of Pearl A Traditional Palestinian Craft  By Saleem Zougbi, Based on the book, “Nacar di Palestina” by Enrique Jidi, Colombia.
 Tourist Products Palestine-family.net, 23.01.2007, Based on the book, "Bethlehem, The Immortal Town" by Giries Elali

Palestinian handicrafts
History of Palestine (region)
Economy of the State of Palestine
Bethlehem
Palestinian inventions